The  is a  long railway line from Nishi-Wakamatsu Station in Aizuwakamatsu to Aizukōgen-Ozeguchi Station in Minamiaizu, Fukushima, Japan. It is owned and operated by Aizu Railway.

Services
The train operation is controlled from Aizu-Tajima Station. The electrified southern part goes beyond the Aizukōgen-Ozeguchi terminus onto the Yagan Railway Aizu Kinugawa Line, Tobu Railway and JR East all the way to Tokyo. The non-electrified northern part runs a diesel service beyond Nishi-Wakamatsu Station to Aizu-Wakamatsu Station on the JR East Tadami Line.

Stations 

 All stations are located in Fukushima Prefecture.
 Local trains stop at all stations.
 Stations stopped at by all trains are marked "●".
 Stations stopped at by some of the trains are marked "◆".
 Limited Express train Revaty Aizu which goes to and departs from Asakusa Station and does not stop at any stations on the Aizu Line except Aizu-Tajima and Aizukogen-Ozeguchi Station.

The service called Sightseeing Rapid, Open-car "torokko" Ozatoro Tenbō Ressha , is operated by Aizu Railway and/or Yagan Railway. Each separate train stops at different locations depending on its name. For example, Yu-Meguri(湯めぐり), which is operated by Yagan Railway runs from Kinugawaonsen Station to Aizu-Tajima Station. As another example, Aizu Roman (会津浪漫号), which is operated by Aizu Railway runs between Aizu-Tajima Station and Aizu-Wakamatsu Station. Reserving a seat on this train costs 320 yen (adult). You can choose one of three seat types (Tatami and Kotatsu, Open Car Truck, Dome Car during which there are reclining seats). Passengers may purchase a ticket at stations where staff is present, or they may ask the train crew to sell them a ticket when they board the train.

History 

The Aizu Line was constructed between 1927 and 1953 by the Japanese National Railways (JNR) as part of a plan to build a direct line from Aizu-Wakamatsu to Tokyo. The Aizu line was the northern section, whilst the Yagan Railway Aizu Kinugawa Line was to be the southern section. Despite the Kinugawa line connecting to the Aizu line in 1986, the Aizu Line was deemed an unprofitable secondary line and transferred to a company established by local governments in 1987.

The Aizukōgen-Ozeguchi - Aizu-Tajima section was electrified at 1500 VDC in 1990 to facilitate through-running onto the Kinugawa line.

Timeline
 November 1, 1927: Nishi-Wakamatsu - Ashimomaki-Onsen section (10.5 km) opens
 December 22, 1932: Ashimomaki-Onsen - Yunokami-Onsen section opens
 December 27, 1934: Yunokami-Onsen - Aizu-Tajima section opens
 December 12, 1947: Aizu-Tajima - Nanatsugatake-Tozanguchi section opens
 November 8, 1953: Nanatsugatake-Tozanguchi - Aizukōgen-Ozeguchi
 December 1, 1980: The 12.2 km deviation between Ashimomaki-Onsen and Yunokami-Onsen opens as part of the construction of the Okawa Dam 
 April 1, 1987: Line transferred to East Japan Railway Company (JR East) upon privatization of JNR 
 July 16, 1987: Line transferred to Aizu Railway
 October 12, 1990: Aizu-Tajima — Aizukōgen-Ozeguchi section electrified (1500 V DC), direct service to the Yagan Railway Aizu Kinugawa Line begins
 April 1, 1999: Japan Freight Railway Company (JR Freight) ends operations
 April 22, 2017: Revaty Aizu uses Tobu 500 series which belongs to Tobu Railway has been commenced operating.
 March 12, 2022: Revaty Aizu has been the only electric train as a train, which runs on Aizu Line because Aizu Railway stopped interconnecting with Yagan Railway except for Revaty Aizu. Simultaneously, Aizu Railway lost the only electric train that Tobu 6050-100 series.

References
This article incorporates material from the corresponding article in the Japanese Wikipedia.

External links
 Aizu Railway Aizu Line Station Guide 

 
Rail transport in Fukushima Prefecture
1067 mm gauge railways in Japan
Japanese third-sector railway lines
1927 establishments in Japan